Scott Flagel (born September 26, 1961) is a former defensive back who played ten seasons in the Canadian Football League for four teams. Flagel was the winner of the CFL's Most Outstanding Canadian Award in 1987 and was a CFL All-Star three times. He won a Grey Cup title in 1984 with the Winnipeg Blue Bombers.

References

1961 births
Living people
Calgary Stampeders players
Canadian football defensive backs
Canadian Football League Most Outstanding Canadian Award winners
Hamilton Tiger-Cats players
Ottawa Rough Riders players
Canadian football people from Winnipeg
Players of Canadian football from Manitoba
Winnipeg Blue Bombers players